Dick-Kobel Homestead, also known as the William Kobel Property, is a historic home located near Jamestown, Cooper County, Missouri.  It was built about 1854, and is a -story log house constructed of 8 inch by 8 inch hand-hewn horizontal logs. A frame addition and open pent porch were added in 1901.  Also on the property is the contributing gable roofed log barn.

It was listed on the National Register of Historic Places in 1982.

References

Houses on the National Register of Historic Places in Missouri
Houses completed in 1854
Houses in Cooper County, Missouri
National Register of Historic Places in Cooper County, Missouri
1854 establishments in Missouri
Log houses in the United States
Log buildings and structures on the National Register of Historic Places in Missouri